Rhytidhysteron rufulum is a saprobic ascomycete able to infect humans.

References

External links 
 Index Fungorum

Fungal citrus diseases
Dothideomycetes enigmatic taxa
Fungi described in 1920